Fern Hollow Animal Stories is a series of over sixteen books written and illustrated by British author John Patience.

About
The series of books revolve around a village populated by animal characters in what appears to be an early 20th century setting. These stories, illustrated in a traditional natural and interesting style, have remained very popular among children and even adults, since they first appeared and there are more than 16 titles in the series.

Books
 The Seasons in Fern Hollow
 Granny Bouncer's Rescue
 The Tortoise Fair
 Muddles at the Manor
 Sigmund's Birthday Surprise
 Mr Rusty's New House
 The Unscary Scarecrow
 The Brass Band Robbery
 Sports Day
 Brock the Balloonist
 Parson Dimly's Treasure Hunt
 Mrs Merryweather's Letter
 The Floating Restaurant
 Castaways on Heron Island
 The Midsummer Banquet
 The Mysterious Fortune Teller
 Spike and the Cowboy Band

References

External links
Fern Hollow - Titles
Rights / Licensing Information
Talewater Press - John Patience's own publishing imprint which is republishing all the Tales from Fern Hollow titles

Series of children's books
Animal tales
Novel series